Mandela's Gun is a 2016 South African biographical film of Nelson Mandela's experience as a guerrilla fighter for the African National Congress. It was directed by John Irvin and shot in South Africa.

Nelson Mandela is portrayed by newcomer Tumisho Masha, who soon after the film's release was arrested on charges of "intent to cause grievous bodily harm" and "malicious damage to property."

References

External links

Films about Nelson Mandela
Films set in South Africa
Films shot in South Africa
Films set in the 1960s
2016 films
English-language South African films
Cultural depictions of Nelson Mandela
Films directed by John Irvin
2010s English-language films